The prime minister of South Africa ( was the head of government in South Africa between 1910 and 1984.

History of the office

The position of Prime Minister was established in 1910, when the Union of South Africa was formed. He was appointed by the head of state—the governor-general until 1961 and the state president after South Africa became a republic in 1961. In practice, he was the leader of the majority party or coalition in the House of Assembly. With few exceptions, the governor-general/state president was bound by convention to act on the prime minister's advice. Thus, the prime minister was the country's leading political figure and de facto chief executive, with powers similar to those of his British counterpart.

The first prime minister was Louis Botha, a former Boer general and war hero during the Second Boer War.

The position of Prime Minister was abolished in 1984, when the State President was given executive powers after a new constitution was adopted – effectively merging the role of Prime Minister and State President. The last Prime Minister of South Africa, P. W. Botha, became the first executive State President after the constitutional reform in 1984 after Marais Viljoen's retirement.

In post-apartheid South Africa, the Inkatha Freedom Party has called for a return to a Westminster-style split executive with a Prime Minister as head of government, which is part of its overarching goal of avoiding a single party South African state.

List of prime ministers of South Africa

Parties

Timeline

See also

 State President of South Africa
 President of South Africa
 Governor-General of South Africa

References

External links

 
1910 establishments in South Africa
1984 disestablishments in South Africa
South Africa, Prime Ministers
Government of South Africa
Lists of political office-holders in South Africa
South Africa and the Commonwealth of Nations

pt:Lista de chefes de estado e de governo da África do Sul